Edward Barry Rust Jr. (born August 3, 1950) was chairman of the board of State Farm Mutual Automobile Insurance Company, Bloomington, Illinois. He is a former President and Chief Executive Officer of State Farm Mutual Automobile Insurance Company and State Farm Fire and Casualty Company, State Farm Life Insurance Company and other principal State Farm affiliates.  Ed Rust stepped down on September 1, 2015; when Michael Tipsord was named the new President and CEO of State Farm Insurance.  Ed Rust's father Edward Sr. and his grandfather Adlai Rust before him also led State Farm.

A native of Illinois, Rust joined State Farm in 1975. He is the son of Edward Barry Rust Sr., who was the former chief executive officer and chairman of State Farm Insurance Companies. He became president and chief executive officer in 1985 and was elected to the additional post of chairman of the board in 1987. 

A graduate of Bloomington High School in 1968 and then a graduate of Illinois Wesleyan University in Bloomington, Rust holds both juris doctor and master of business degrees from Southern Methodist University, Dallas, Texas.  He serves on the boards of directors of Caterpillar Inc., Peoria, Illinois.; and Helmerich & Payne

He is also on the board of McGraw-Hill Companies, Inc., New York, NY is one of two co-chairs of the Business Roundtable and is on the Board of Directors for the US Chamber of Commerce. The chairman, Harold McGraw III is CEO of McGraw-Hill companies.

In June 2015 Rust announced that after 30 years he would step down as CEO of State Farm in September 2015.

Awards
In 2013, AdvisoryCloud ranked Edward Rust as the #6 CEO on their Top Chief Executive List.

Edward B. Rust Jr.  was inducted as a Laureate of The Lincoln Academy of Illinois and awarded the Order of Lincoln (the State’s highest honor) by the Governor of Illinois in 2003 in the area of Business.

References

External links
http://www.businessweek.com/1999/99_45/b3654191.htm

1950 births
Living people
Caterpillar Inc. people
People from Bloomington, Illinois
American businesspeople in insurance
American chief executives of financial services companies
American corporate directors
Bloomington High School (Bloomington, Illinois) alumni
Illinois Wesleyan University alumni
Southern Methodist University alumni
State Farm people